Home Sweet Mobile Home is the fifth studio album by American singer-songwriter Nellie McKay, released on September 28, 2010, by Verve Records.

Track listing

Charts

References

Nellie McKay albums
2010 albums
Verve Records albums